Advanced Placement (AP) Physics C: Electricity and Magnetism (also known as AP Physics C: E&M, or AP E&M) is an Advanced Placement science course about electricity and magnetism. It is one of the four AP Physics courses offered in some U.S. secondary schools.

Course content

E&M is equivalent to an introductory college course in electricity and magnetism for physics or engineering majors. The course modules are:
 Electrostatics
 Conductors, capacitors, and dielectrics
 Electric circuits
 Magnetic fields
 Electromagnetism.

Methods of calculus are used wherever appropriate in formulating physical principles and in applying them to physical problems. Therefore, students should have completed or be concurrently enrolled in a calculus class.

This course may be combined with AP Physics C: Mechanics to make a unified Physics C course that prepares for both exams. In this scenario, Electricity and Magnetism is typically taught second, as it requires much of the knowledge gained in the Mechanics course.

AP test
The course culminates in an optional exam for which high-performing students may receive some credit towards their college coursework, depending on the institution.

Registration
The AP examination for AP Physics C: Electricity and Magnetism is separate from the AP examination for AP Physics C: Mechanics. Before 2006, test-takers paid only once and were given the choice of taking either one or two parts of the Physics C test.

Format
The exam is typically administered on a Monday afternoon in May. The exam is configured in two categories: a 35-question multiple choice section and a 3-question free response section. Test takers are allowed to use an approved calculator during the entire exam. The test is weighted such that each section is worth half of the final score. This and AP Physics C: Mechanics are the shortest AP exams, with total testing time of 90 minutes.

The topics covered by the exam are as follows:

Grade distribution
The grade distributions for the Physics C: Electricity and Magnetism scores since 2010 were:

See also 
Physics
Glossary of physics

References

External links
College Board Course Description: Physics

Advanced Placement
Physics education
Standardized tests